The Master of Psychology (often abbreviated Psy.M. or M.Psych.) is a master's degree in the field of Psychology.

Australia 
In Australia, the MPsych title is usually associated with a specialization, such as MPsych (Clinical) or MPsych (Counselling).

France 
In France, the PsyM is a professional and/or a research master's degree and is offered through a number of different universities. The PsyM is considered as a specialization in one of the different fields of psychology (neuropsychology, psychopathology, occupational psychology, ...).

A professional PsyM is required to access the title of psychologist, and practice as such in clinical settings
.

All students entering a professional PsyM program are required to have a recognized bachelor's degree in a related field. The PsyM is a two years long diploma, conferring at its term a 5-years university diploma.

Germany 
In Germany, the completion of a 5-years higher-education degree course in psychology is required to use "psychologist" as a professional title, equivalent to the German "Diplom" or "masters" qualification in psychology.

See also
Bachelor of Psychology
Doctor of Psychology
History of psychology
Psychologist

References

External links
Psychologue, une profession réglementée

Psychology, Master
Psychology education